Svartfjella ("The Black Mountains") is a mountain area in Oscar II Land at Spitsbergen, Svalbard. It is located between the glacier of Bullbreen and the lowland of Svartfjellstranda, at the eastern side of Forlandsundet. The highest peak is 674 m.a.s.l., and the area extends over a length of about 4.5 kilometers.

References

Mountains of Spitsbergen